"Linda on My Mind" is a song written and recorded by American country music artist Conway Twitty.  It was released in January 1975 as the first single and title track from the album Linda on My Mind.  The song was Twitty's 12th number one on the U.S. country singles chart.  The single stayed at number one for one week and spent a total of eight weeks on the chart.

Personnel
Conway Twitty — lead vocals
Carol Lee Cooper, L.E. White — background vocals
Harold Bradley — 6-string electric bass guitar
Ray Edenton — acoustic guitar
Johnny Gimble — fiddle
John Hughey — steel guitar
Tommy Markham — drums
Grady Martin — electric guitar
Bob Moore — bass
Hargus "Pig" Robbins — piano

Chart performance

References

1975 singles
1975 songs
Conway Twitty songs
Songs written by Conway Twitty
Song recordings produced by Owen Bradley
MCA Records singles